In Hinduism, Devala was one of the great rishis or sages. He is acknowledged to be a great authority like Narada and Vyasa and is mentioned by Arjuna in Bhagavad Gita (10.13).

According to the Devanga Purana, Sage Devala is the progenitor of the Devanga community. The person called "Agni Manu" was the first weaver, who weaves clothes for all. After his liberation, the demand for clothes became high. Devala is known to have emerged from the third eye or from the heart of Lord Shiva to create clothing and to teach weaving to the world. Sage Devala is the progenitor of the Devanga community.

Weaver

When Devala returned after obtaining threads from Lord Vishnu, a group of five demons attacked him. It is a dark night and the demons were all-powerful. Devala struggled with Vishnu's Chakra and finally prayed to Sakthi to protect him. Devi Sakthi appeared with fluorescence and glory, wearing a bright Crown, holding Trisul and other weapons in her hands and riding a lion. She killed the demons and their blood was in the colors of white, black, red, green, and yellow. Devala soaked the threads in the demons colorful blood. Later, Devi Sakthi was named as Chowdeswari or Sowdeswari (Chowda/Sowda/Sooda means the brightness). She advised Devala to worship her on every new moon night. 

Devala went to South Himalaya and owned "Sagara Kingdom" with Amodh Nagar as its capital, wove new clothes and gave them to Trimurti, Tridevi, Deva, Asura, Gandharva, Kinnar, and ordinary people. Devala gave clothes to cover Deva's body parts so his community is named Devanga (Anga=Body part) Community.

Marriage 
He married Suryadev's younger sister Deva Dhutta, becoming Surya's first kinsmen then Aadhi Shesha's daughter Chandra Rekha. Devanga people are called Sedar/Jendar (Shesha is pronounced as Seda in Tamil). Later he married Asura Vakradantha's daughter Agni Dhutta. People who follow Devala are known as Devanga or Devangar. The main god for Devala is Sri Ramalinga Sowdeswari Amman.

His descendants are known as Devanga.

References

Rishis